The Pierce County Executive is the head of the executive branch of Pierce County, Washington. The position is subject to four-year terms (with a term limit of 2) and is a partisan office.

History 

County voters approved the adoption of a home-rule charter for Pierce County on November 4, 1980, creating the position of a county executive and a seven-member county council. ​Prior to the adoption, the county government was led by three commissioners elected at-large. The new position took effect on May 1, 1981, with Booth Gardner elected as the first executive.

List of executives

See also 
 King County Executive
 Snohomish County Executive
 Whatcom County Executive

Notes

References

External links 
 Pierce County Executive

Executive
County officials in Washington (state)
County executives in the United States